A list of films produced in France in 1995.

External links
 1995 in France
 1995 in French television
 French films of 1995 at the Internet Movie Database
French films of 1995 at Cinema-francais.fr

1995
Films
French